is a four-year private university in Atsubetsu-ku, Sapporo, Hokkaidō, Japan. The university is run by Hokusei Gakuen School System, whose education philosophy is based on Christianity.

Its name Hokusei (北星) means "north (北)" and "star (星)." It is derived from the biblical reference "Shine like stars, in a dark world" (Philippians 2:15). It was recommended by Japanese scholar and politician Inazo Nitobe and praised by the founder of the university Sarah Clara Smith. The university shares its campus with the two-year Hokusei Gakuen University Junior College and Hokusei Gakuen University Graduate School.

History 
The history of Hokusei Gakuen University goes back in time to 1887, when an American missionary of the United Presbyterian Church of North America, Sarah Clara Smith founded "Smith Girls' School." In 1894, the school was relocated and renamed "Hokusei Women’s School" as Japanese scholar Inazo Nitobe recommended.

After Smith returned to the United States, the school experienced several renovations and expansions. In 1962, Hokusei Gakuen University was officially founded with the Department of English, Department of Social Welfare, and School of Humanities.

In 2007, the Hokusei Gakuen School System marked its 120th anniversary since the foundation of Smith Girls’ School and planned to have a ceremony in Chūō-ku, Sapporo with other Hokusei Gakuen schools: Hokusei Gakuen University Junior College, Hokusei Gakuen University High School, Hokusei Gakuen Girls' Junior & Senior High School, and Hokusei Yoichi High School.

Academics and organization

Undergraduate units 
 School of Humanities
Department of English
Department of Psychology and Applied Communication
School of Economics
Department of Economics
Department of Management Information
Department of Law and Economics
School of Social Welfare
Department of Social Policy
Department of Social Work
Department of Psychology for Well-being

Postgraduate units 
Graduate School of Literature
Graduate School of Economics
Graduate School of Social Welfare

Notable alumni
Waki Yamato, Japanese manga artist

Sources 
Hokusei Gakuen University/Hokusei Gakuen University Junior College Campus Guide 2007

External links 
Hokusei Gakuen University Homepage

Private universities and colleges in Japan
Universities and colleges affiliated with the Church of the Brethren
Hokusei Gakuen University
Christian universities and colleges in Japan
Educational institutions established in 1962
Hokkaido American Football Association
Association of Christian Universities and Colleges in Asia
1962 establishments in Japan